{{Infobox officeholder
|name=Zaheer-ul-Daulah Artuk Beg
|image=
|image_size= 
|birth_date=unknown
|death_date=1091
|birth_place=
|death_place=Jerusalem, Seljuk Empire
|office= Governor of Jerusalem
|term_start= 1085
|term_end= 1091
|lieutenant=
|predecessor= 
|successor= Ilghazi and Sökmen
|nationality=Oghuz Turk from the Doger tribe 
|allegiance=Seljuk Empire
|serviceyears=
|rank=General 
|commands=
|battles=Battle of Manzikert (1071)  Conquest of Amid (1085)  Battle of Ain Salm (1086)
}}
Zaheer-ul-Daulah Artuk Beg, known as Artuk Bey, was a Turkmen commander of the Seljuk Empire in the 11th century, chief of the Oghuz tribe of Döğer, and eponymous founder of the Artuqid dynasty.  His father's name was Eksük.  He was the Seljuk governor of Jerusalem between 1085–1091. Although the Artuqid dynasty was named after him, actually the dynasty was founded by his sons Sökmen and Ilghazi after his death.  He was also father to Alp-Yaruq, Bahram, Abd al-Jabar, and three other sons.

In Anatolia
Artuk Bey was one of the commanders of the Great Seljuk Empire army during the Battle of Manzikert in 1071. After the battle, he took part in the conquest of Anatolia on behalf of the Seljuk Empire. He captured the Yeşilırmak valley in 1074. In 1075, Artuk captured on behalf of the Byzantine Empire the Norman rebell Roussel de Bailleul and handed him over to the future emperor Alexios Komnenos. He also served the sultan by quashing a rebellion in 1077.

His next mission was a campaign in 1086 to capture Diyarbakır (Amid) from the Marwanids. In this campaign he quarreled with the commander-in-chief Fakhr al-Dawla ibn Jahir who tended to make peace with Marwanids. In a surprise attack he defeated reinforcements to Marwanids.  However, when the sultan Malik Shah I heard about the event he accused Artuk.

In Syria
Artuk left the battle field and attended to Tutush I who was Malik Shah's discordant younger brother in Syria in 1084. In 1086 he was instrumental in defeating Suleiman ibn Qutulmish, the sultan of Seljuks of Rûm in the battle of Ain Salm between Süleyman and Tutush.

In Jerusalem
Tutush granted him al-Quds (Jerusalem) as an iqta and Artuk was governor there until his death in 1091. His grave is in a tomb next to his khanqah near the Gate of al-Dawadariya, known as Gate of King Faisal today.

In popular culture

In the Turkish TV series, Diriliş: Ertuğrul'', he is portrayed as a close companion of Ertuğrul by the Turkish actor, Ayberk Pekcan. This is anachronistic as Ertuğrul died in 1280 and their live spans most likely did not overlapped.

Citation

Sources

Generals of the Seljuk Empire
1091 deaths
11th-century births
Artuqids
Medieval Jerusalem
11th-century Turkic people
Turkic rulers